Mark Stewart (7 January 1905 – 2 March 1993) was a Scotland international rugby union player. He became the 80th President of the Scottish Rugby Union.

Rugby union career

Amateur career
Stewart played for Stewart's College FP.

Provincial career
He played for Edinburgh District in the 1931 inter-city match.

International career
He was capped nine times for Scotland in the period 1932-34.

Administrative career
He became the 80th President of the Scottish Rugby Union. He served the standard one year from 1966 to 1967.

References

1905 births
1993 deaths
Scottish rugby union players
Scotland international rugby union players
Rugby union players from Musselburgh
Presidents of the Scottish Rugby Union
Stewart's College FP players
Edinburgh District (rugby union) players
Rugby union locks